Otto Binswanger (1852–1929) was a Swiss neurologist, psychiatrist, and professor and cousin of Otto Saly Binswanger.

Otto Binswanger may also refer to:

Otto Saly Binswanger (1854–1917), German-American chemist, physician, and professor; cousin of Otto Ludwig Binswanger